Tyndall is an impact crater in the Cebrenia quadrangle of Mars, located at 40.0°N latitude and 190.1°W longitude. The name was approved in 1973, by the International Astronomical Union (IAU) Working Group for Planetary System Nomenclature.

See also 
 Climate of Mars
 Geology of Mars
 List of craters on Mars

References 

Cebrenia quadrangle
Impact craters on Mars